is a former Japanese football player.

Playing career
Kumon was born in Kanagawa Prefecture on October 20, 1966. After graduating from Aoyama Gakuin University, he joined Japan Soccer League club Furukawa Electric in 1989. He played as left side back from first season. In 1992, he moved to Japan Football League club Fujita Industries based in his local. The club won the champions in 1993 and was promoted to J1 League from 1994. From 1994, he played many matches and the club won the champions 1994 Emperor's Cup and 1995 Asian Cup Winners' Cup. Although he played as regular player, he was released end of 1998 season due to their financial problems. In 1999, he moved to new club Yokohama FC in Japan Football League. The club won the champions for 2 years in a row (1999-2000) and was promoted to J2 League. He retired end of 2002 season.

Club statistics

References

External links

1966 births
Living people
Aoyama Gakuin University alumni
Association football people from Kanagawa Prefecture
Japanese footballers
Japan Soccer League players
J1 League players
J2 League players
Japan Football League (1992–1998) players
Japan Football League players
JEF United Chiba players
Shonan Bellmare players
Yokohama FC players
Association football defenders